Les Poneys sauvages ("the wild ponies") is a 1970 novel by the French writer Michel Déon. It tells the story of five friends who studied together at an English university, and how their friendship and loyalty keep them together during World War II and the Cold War, as they spread over Europe and to varying degrees engage in poetry, espionage, travels and unpredictable behaviour. The narration alternates between a first-person perspective and that of an epistolary novel.

The novel received the Prix Interallié. It was adapted into a 1983 television series with the same title, directed by Robert Mazoyer, which ran in five episodes, starring Jacques Weber.

References

External links
 Les Poneys sauvages at the publisher's website 

1970 French novels
French novels adapted into films
French-language novels
Novels by Michel Déon
Novels set in Greece
Novels set in Italy
Novels set in the Soviet Union
Novels set in the United Kingdom
Books about Yemen